The 1946 South Carolina State Bulldogs football team was an American football team that represented South Carolina State University as a member of the Southern Intercollegiate Athletic Conference (SIAC) during the 1946 college football season. In their first season under head coach Oliver C. Dawson, the Bulldogs compiled a 5–3–1 record and outscored opponents by a total of 146 to 82. 

In December 1946, The Pittsburgh Courier applied the Dickinson System to the black college teams and rated South Carolina State at No. 14.

The team played its home games in Orangeburg, South Carolina.

Schedule

References

South Carolina State
South Carolina State Bulldogs football seasons
South Carolina State Bulldogs football